Mengey is a rural locality (an ulus) in Selenginsky District, Republic of Buryatia, Russia. The population was 13 as of 2010. There is 1 street.

References 

Rural localities in Selenginsky District